Ramat Polytechnic is a state  tertiary institution of learning in Maiduguri Borno State, Nigeria. It was established by the government of the defunct North-Eastern State in January 1973 as Government Technical College.

Background 
The College was renamed and upgraded to Ramat College of Technology in April 1978 by the Government of Borno State in honour of the then Head of State, late General Murtala Ramat Muhammad. Ramat college received its polytechnic status in August 1979 in conformity with the Federal Government initiative to rename all Colleges of Technology in the country to Polytechnic.
 Ramat Polytechnic is a federal government approved tertiary institution and it was recognized by the National Board for Technical Education (NBTE) and the National Commission for Colleges of Education (NCCE).

Courses 
The College has 30 Academic Departments which are structured under 5 academic schools, which are:

 School of Agricultural and Applied Sciences
 School of Engineering and Bio-Environmental Technology
 School of Environmental Studies
 School of Management Studies
 School of Vocational and Technical Education.

See Also 
List of Polytechnics in Nigeria

References

External links
 Official website Ramat Polytechnic

Polytechnics in Nigeria
Public universities in Nigeria
1973 establishments in Nigeria
Educational institutions established in 1973
Education in Borno State
Maiduguri